Polaram (Village ID 574710) is a village and panchayat in Ranga Reddy district in the Indian state of Andhra Pradesh. It falls under Shabad mandal. According to the 2011 census it has a population of 425 living in 91 households. Its main agriculture product is cotton growing.

References

Villages in Ranga Reddy district